John Jaffray may refer to:
Sir John Jaffray, 1st Baronet (1818–1901), British journalist and newspaper proprietor
John Jaffray (bookbinder) (1811–1869), English bookbinder active in the early Chartist movement
Sir John Henry Jaffray, 3rd Baronet (1893–1916) of the Jaffray baronets